Columbia Bridge may refer to:

 Columbia Railroad Bridge in Philadelphia, Pennsylvania
 Columbia Bridge (New Hampshire) over the Connecticut River between Columbia, New Hampshire and Lemington, Vermont